Uni's On Air (Japanese: ユニゾンエアー, Yunisonea-, sylized in all caps) is a Japanese rhythm game developed by Akatsuki Inc. and published by Seed & Flower. The game features songs and members from the idol groups Sakurazaka46 (Keyakizaka46) and Hinatazaka46. The game is only released in Japan and not available worldwide.

Gameplay 
The game's main gameplay is in "Live" mode, in which players tap on the five buttons at the bottom of the screen at the proper time to receive a score. A combo score multiplier is given for maintaining a chain of consecutive hits without missing notes. Concert footage of the songs are played in the background. Scores are then classified into C, B, A, S, SS, or SSS rank, with C being lowest and SSS being highest. Songs are divided into three difficulties: "Normal", "Pro", and "Master"; a fourth "Pro+" is available for select songs. A "Live" difficulty level is provided just to watch the concert footage.

There are a total of 57 songs included. Songs span all Sakurazaka46 and Keyakizaka46 singles, Hiragana Keyakizaka46's album Hashiridasu Shunkan, and 3 of Hinatazaka46's single "Kyun", "Do Re Mi Sol La Si Do" & "Konna ni Suki ni Natchatte Ii no?". "Dare no Koto o Ichiban Aishiteru?" from AKB48's Bokutachi wa, Ano Hi no Yoake o Shitteiru was added into the game as part of Keyakizaka46's 3rd Year Anniversary Live.

Team formation 
Cards are classified into five colors: red, blue, green, yellow, or purple; they are also classified into three rarities: R, SR, and SSR. These cards can then be built into five-unit teams; using the same color card as the song yields a higher score.

Cards may be leveled up in two ways. In , players may increase the card's level through "lesson points". In , players upgrade specific attributes in a hierarchical order. Talent blossoming also unlocks other content, including more pictures, interview footage, voice recordings, and costumes.

Other content 
"Dramas" are also included, where players can watch fictional stories featuring the members.

Release and reception 
Uni's On Air was first announced by Akatsuki on 18 July 2019; the official website was released on the same day. The game was available for download on 23 September 2019 and gameplay began on the 24th later. A day later on the 25th, Akatsuki reported that the game had hit a million downloads.

The game was recognized in the "popular games" category in the 2019 App Ape Awards.

References

External links

External links 
  
  
  (September 26, 2019-) 
  on YouTube (June 28, 2019-) 

2019 video games
Android (operating system) games
IOS games
Music video games
Video games developed in Japan
Keyakizaka46
Hinatazaka46
Video games based on musicians